The Egyptian Super Cup is Egyptian football's annual match contested between the champions of the previous Egyptian Premier League season and the holders of the Egypt Cup. If the Egyptian Premier League champions also won the Egypt Cup then the cup runners-up provide the opposition. The competition was founded in 2001.

Results

Results by club

See also
 Egyptian Premier League
 Egypt Cup

Notes

References

 
1
Egypt